Kyle Andrew Selig (born September 28, 1992) is an American actor, dancer, and singer. He is known for originating the role of Aaron Samuels in the 2018 Tony-nominated musical, Mean Girls and for playing the role of Mr. Komos in Monster High: The Movie.

Early life and education
Selig was raised in Huntington Beach, California. He is the son of Stuart and Sharon (née Kennedy) Selig and has a half-brother, Riley and half-sister, Harmony.

Selig first became interested in theatre after seeing his older sister performing a local play.  As his interest grew, he often attended musical theatre intensives, such as CAP21, during his summer breaks.

He graduated from Huntington Beach High School in 2010 and was named prom king at the end of his senior year. At Huntington Beach High School, he attended the district magnet program, the Huntington Beach Academy for the Performing Arts, as a Musical Theater major and played the lead Don Lockwood in Singin' in the Rain (musical). In June 2010, at the age of 17, Selig won the National High School Musical Theatre Award (also known as the "Jimmy Award") along with a $10,000 scholarship. He then attended the Carnegie Mellon University, earning a BFA in musical theatre in 2014.

Career
In August 2013, while still attending Carnegie Mellon, Selig was cast as the standby for the lead role of Elder Kevin Price in Broadway production of The Book of Mormon. He remained with the company as its standby for three months, earning credit towards his undergraduate degree via independent study. Months later in December of that same year, Selig joined the second national touring production of The Book of Mormon again as a standby for the role of Elder Price.

Selig left The Book of Mormon tour on July 26, 2014 to begin rehearsals for the national tour of the musical, Pippin, in which he was cast as the musical's titular character. Selig rehearsed with the touring company of Pippin but was placed on vocal rest just one week before the tour was scheduled to open. He was then replaced by Matthew James Thomas, who originated the role of Pippin in the recent Broadway revival. Despite being said to be on a medical leave of absence, Selig never rejoined the touring company; but instead, when Thomas left the production, he was replaced by Kyle Dean Massey. In interviews, Selig has alluded to being fired "from one of his first big jobs," but has never publicly confirmed his being fired from the Pippin tour.

Selig rejoined the Broadway cast of The Book of Mormon in February 2015 as an ensemble replacement and Elder Price standby. His first performance as Elder Price on Broadway took place on April 15, 2015. For seven weeks in early 2016, he led the Broadway company of The Book of Mormon as Elder Price, replacing Gavin Creel, who left the production to star in She Loves Me. On February 21, 2016, Selig left the production and was replaced by Nic Rouleau.

In the summer of 2016, he appeared as Baby John in West Side Story at the Hollywood Bowl with the Los Angeles Philharmonic, alongside Jeremy Jordan and Karen Olivo. Selig starred as Homer Hickam in the musical, October Sky, inspired by the film of the same name at the Old Globe Theatre in San Diego, California in the fall of 2016. In the spring of 2017, Selig portrayed Dauphin in The Public Theater's world premiere of the off-Broadway rock musical, Joan of Arc: Into the Fire directed by Alex Timbers.

Selig starred as Aaron Samuels in the Tony Award-nominated Broadway musical, Mean Girls, written by Tina Fey with music and lyrics by Jeff Richmond and Nell Benjamin, respectively. The show had its world premiere as an out-of-town tryout at the National Theatre in Washington, D.C. from October 31, 2017 to December 3, 2017 in which Selig originated the role. The musical, which is based on the film of the same name, began previews on March 12, 2018, and officially opened on Broadway on April 8, 2018 at the August Wilson Theatre. In December 2019, it was announced that Selig would be taking a leave of absence from Mean Girls, and internet personality and actor, Cameron Dallas, would be filling the role of Aaron Samuels for four-week engagement. The production and Selig's final performance was March 11, 2020. The show closed due to the COVID-19 pandemic and it was announced on January 7, 2021 that it would not reopen after the pandemic ends.

In March 2019, Selig portrayed Gene, opposite Mean Girls co-star Erika Henningsen, in Stephen Sondheim's Saturday Night at Second Stage Theater, as a part of the theater's "Musical Mondays" weekly concert series.

On March 16, 2021, Selig released his first album.

Philanthropy and social activism
In August 2018 Selig participated in Covenant House's Stage & Screen Sleep Out along with Mean Girls co-stars Ashley Park and Curtis Holland, and together they raised over $14,000 for this organization which provides shelter, food, and crisis care for homeless and runaway youth. Selig also has served as a mentor and held masterclasses for aspiring performers.

Personal life
Selig has been in a relationship with fellow actor Erika Henningsen, since late 2017 after meeting during the out-of-town tryout for Mean Girls in Washington, D.C. The two announced their engagement on July 1, 2021 after a trip to Hawaii.

Theatre credits 

• 
• Nic Rouleau was supposed to play Elder Price in 2022, but due to an injury, Selig reprised his role for two weeks.

Filmography

Television

Discography

Cast recordings
 Mean Girls – Original Broadway Cast Recording (2018)

Albums 

 Careful Days (2021)

Collaborative projects
 And the Tree Was Happy (2013)
 She Breathes (2016)
 Broadway's Carols for a Cure, Volume 20 (2018)
 Broadway's Carols for a Cure, Volume 21 (2019)

Awards and nominations

Special honors and awards
 2010 – National High School Musical Theatre Award
 2018 – Arts Schools Network's Outstanding Arts School Alumni Award

References

External links
 Official website
 
 

1992 births
21st-century American male actors
American male musical theatre actors
American male stage actors
Carnegie Mellon University College of Fine Arts alumni
Male actors from Huntington Beach, California
Living people